Rudolf Gandler is an Austrian Paralympic athlete. He competed at the 1984 Summer Paralympics in the men's discus throw A2 and men's shot put A2 events.

He won the silver medal in the men's shot put A2 event.

References

External links 
 

Living people
Year of birth missing (living people)
Place of birth missing (living people)
Medalists at the 1984 Summer Paralympics
Paralympic silver medalists for Austria
Paralympic medalists in athletics (track and field)
Athletes (track and field) at the 1984 Summer Paralympics
Paralympic athletes of Austria
Austrian male discus throwers
Austrian male shot putters
Discus throwers with limb difference
Shot putters with limb difference
Paralympic discus throwers
Paralympic shot putters
20th-century Austrian people
21st-century Austrian people